Seleucia on the Tigris (Seleúkeia,  "place of Seleucus") was the first capital of the Seleucid Empire and one of the great cities of antiquity but is now an abandoned ruin.

Seleucia also prominently refers to Seleucia Pieria, the port of Antioch at the mouth of the Orontes, now the city of Samandağı, Turkey.

Seleucia may also refer to:

Places
Seleucia, a Byzantine theme of the 9th–12th centuries centered in Seleucia in Isauria
Seleucia or Abila (Decapolis), a former settlement near modern Irbid, Jordan 
Seleucia, a former name of Umm Qais, Jordan
Seleucia ad Belum, later Seleucobelus, a former settlement at the headwater of the Orontes in Syria
Seleucia ad Eulaeum or Seleucia on the Eulaeus, a former name of Susa, Iran
Seleucia ad Maeandrum, a former name of Aydın, Turkey
Seleucia ad Pyramum or Mopsuestia, now in Adana Province, Turkey
Seleucia at the Zeugma, a former settlement probably near Sırataşlar, Turkey
Seleucia by the Sea, a former name of Samandağı, Turkey
Seleucia-Ctesiphon, bishopric in Assyria (now Iraq), diocesan precursor of the Chaldean Catholic patriarchate of Babylon
Seleucia in Caria, a former name of Aydın, Turkey
Seleucia in Isauria, a former name of Silifke, Turkey
Seleucia on the Calycadnus, a former name of Silifke, Turkey
Seleucia on the Euphrates, a former name of Zeugma, Turkey
Seleucia Ferrea, a former settlement and diocese at Selef, Turkey
Seleucia on Hedyphon, a former settlement in Kirkuk, Iraq
Seleucia Pamphylia, a former settlement at Bucakşeyhler, Turkey 
Seleucia Pieria (Seleucia by the Sea), the seaport of Antioch ad Orontes (Syria Prima)
Seleucia Samulias on the former Lake Merom in Israel
Seleucia Sidera in Pisidia, a former settlement at Selef, Turkey
Seleucia Sittacene, a former settlement located on the Tigris shore   opposite the more famous Seleucia
Seleucia Susiana, a former settlement at Ja Nishin, Iran
Seleucia Tracheotis, a former name of Silifke, Turkey

Religion
 Patriarchal Province of Seleucia-Ctesiphon, central ecclesiastical province of the Church of the East

Biology
Seleucia (moth), a genus of moths in the family Pyralidae

See also 
 Seleucus (disambiguation)
 Seleucid Empire
 Seleuciana
 Seleucobelus